Dubník is a municipality and village in the Nové Zámky District in the Nitra Region of south-west Slovakia.

History
In historical records the village was first mentioned in 1236.

Geography
The village lies at an altitude of 146 metres and covers an area of 41.006 km². It has a population of about 1,765 people.

Ethnicity
The population is about 65% Hungarian and 35% Slovak.

Facilities
The village has a public library and a football pitch.

Genealogical resources

The records for genealogical research are available at the state archive "Statny Archiv in Nitra, Slovakia"

 Roman Catholic church records (births/marriages/deaths): 1703-1898 (parish A)
 Lutheran church records (births/marriages/deaths): 1785-1896 (parish B)
 Reformated church records (births/marriages/deaths): 1815-1945 (parish A)

See also
 List of municipalities and towns in Slovakia

References

External links
 Dubník – Nové Zámky Okolie
Surnames of living people in Dubnik

Villages and municipalities in Nové Zámky District